Lake Lothing is a saltwater lake located in Lowestoft in the English county of Suffolk. The lake, which is believed to be the remnant of medieval peat cutting, flows into the North Sea and forms part of the Port of Lowestoft. The area was the major industrial centre of Lowestoft with ship building and other engineering industries, much of which has now closed.

The lake splits Lowestoft in two. It is bridged in the centre of town by a bascule bridge and in Oulton Broad by a vertical lift bridge and a rail swing bridge. A new lifting road bridge, Lowestoft Gull Wing, is under construction and will bridge the lake towards the middle. Mutford lock connects Lake Lothing to Oulton Broad from where access to the River Waveney and the Broads system is gained through Oulton Dyke.

References

Lowestoft
Ports and harbours of Suffolk
Marinas in England
Suffolk Broads